Active Citizenship was a left-wing political and electoral alliance in San Marino, formed to contest the 2012 general election. It comprises
United Left (SU, democratic socialist), 
Civic 10.

References

Defunct left-wing political party alliances
Defunct political party alliances in San Marino
San Marino